The Jade and the Pearl is a 2010 Hong Kong film co-produced by Shaw Brothers Studio, Television Broadcasts Limited and Emperor Motion Pictures.

Cast

Main cast
 Charlene Choi as Princess Yin (嫣公主)
 Raymond Lam as General Ching Hin (程騫)
 Joey Yung as Chuk Sam Leung (祝三娘), a thief who lives on the top of the mountain
 Wong Cho-lam as Ling Kam Hoi (凌感開), a storyteller
 Ti Lung as King (皇上)
 Sire Ma as Princess Sau (秀公主)
 Macy Chan as Princess Wah (樺公主)
 Christine Kuo as Princess Kuo (苟公主)
 Kathy Yuen as Princess Yuen (婉公主)
 Katy Kung as Princess Kung (欣公主)
 Jess Shum as Princess Ying (盈公主)
 Mavis Pan as Princess Ping (平公主)
 Tsui Ming as Princess Ko (高公主)
 Yung Kai Nei as Princess Kwai (貴公主)
 Lam Yuen Ha as Princess Heung (香公主)
 Sherry Chen as Chui Luk (翠綠), an odalisque
 Cilla Kung as To Hung (桃紅), an odalisque
 Chapman To as Eunuch Yeung (楊公公)
 Carlo Ng as Eunuch Cheung (張公公)
 Tien Niu as Mrs. Ching (程夫人), Ching Hin's mother
 Alex Man as Poon Wong (番王)
 Patrick Dunn as the "To Fa Wui" host (桃花會主持)
 Lam Chiu Wing as Lee Ngok Ba (李惡霸)
 6 Wing as Sai Moon (西門)
 Tats Lau as Thief Tat (山賊達, a follower of Chuk Sam Leung
 Steven Cheung as Thief Fan (山賊凡), a follower of Chuk Sam Leung
 Lam Suet as Sing Fu (成虎, a follower of General Ching
 Wong You Nam as Sing Pau (成豹), a follower of General Ching
 JJ Jia as Yeing Fa (楊花), a follower of General Ching
 Kenny Kwan as Scholar Cheung (張公子)
 Ken Hung as Scholar Chu (朱公子)
 Matthew Ko as Scholar Wong (王公子)
 Benjamin Yuen as Scholar Ho (何公子)
 Hayama Go as an Envy State agent (番國特使)
 Anderson Junior as the Mayor (鎮長)
 Chow Chi Ho as Bandit Luk Kam Sing (土匪陸金勝)
 Wong Chi Bun as the artist (畫師)
 Lam Kwok Ping as an art appreciator (藝術欣賞者)
 Kung Siu Ping as a story listener (說書聽眾)

External links
 
 
 

2010 films
2010s Cantonese-language films
2010 romantic comedy-drama films
Shaw Brothers Studio films
Hong Kong romantic comedy-drama films
2010 comedy films
2010 drama films
2010s Hong Kong films